Bindu Panicker is an Indian actress who has more than 200 films to her credit. She has played both comedy and character roles in Malayalam cinema. She won the Kerala State Film Award for the best supporting actress in 2001 for Soothradharan. She was a member of the Association of Malayalam Movie Artists executive committee.

Awards and nominations

Filmography

Television

1995: Moharavam (Doordarshan)
2005: Sahadharmini (Asianet)
 Ellam Mayajalam (Asianet)
Santhanagopalam (Asianet)
Snehathinte Mullukal (Doordarshan)
Ayyadi Maname (Kairali TV)
Snehasammanam
Manalnagaram
Naalukettu
Vamsham
Roses in December

References

External links
 

Actresses from Kochi
Living people
Actresses in Malayalam cinema
Indian film actresses
20th-century Indian actresses
Kerala State Film Award winners
21st-century Indian actresses
Actresses in Malayalam television
Indian television actresses
Actresses in Tamil cinema
Year of birth missing (living people)